The Seven Pearls is a 1917 American silent action film serial directed by Louis J. Gasnier and Donald MacKenzie. Fragments are held by the Library of Congress.

Cast
 Mollie King as Ilma Bay
 Creighton Hale as Harry Drake
 Léon Bary as Perry Mason
 John J. Dunn as Grady
 Henry G. Sell as Handsome Jack
 Floyd Buckley
 Walter P. Lewis

Chapter titles
 The Sultan's Necklace
 The Bowstring
 The Air Peril
 Amid the Clouds
 Between Fire and Water
 The Abandoned Mine
 The False Pearl
 The Man Trap
 The Message on the Wire
 The Hold-Up
 Gems of Jeopardy
 Buried Alive
 Over the Falls
 The Tower of Death
 The Seventh Pearl

Reception
Like many American films of the time, The Seven Pearls was subject to cuts by city and state film censorship boards. For example, the Chicago Board of Censors required, in Chapter 5, a cut of the scenes where an airman threw two bombs at an automobile and of the shooting of a man in a ship; in Chapter 7, of the binding of the woman and man, in Chapter 10, the intertitle "Have $100,000 in the safe, etc.", setting fire to the waste paper basket, the holdup of the bank watchman, and all scenes showing detail of the attempt of the bank robbery; in Chapter 11, Reel 1, three scenes of the holdup of the young woman and her abduction, the pointing at woman's side as officer stops the machine, five holdup scenes in room, the holdup of the woman in the house, the binding of the woman, and Reel 2, the entire incident of the acid and candle burning nearby and the intertitle "It will not kill you – it will only spoil your beauty"; and, in Chapter 13, putting the bound and gagged young woman into a piano box; in Chapter 14, two scenes of choking young woman, blow to man's head, throwing man in front of train; in Chapter 15, the detailed method of a man fixing a gas bomb, drilling a safety deposit box, stealing pearls, and choking the young woman.

References

External links

1917 films
American silent serial films
American black-and-white films
Lost American films
Pathé Exchange film serials
Films directed by Louis J. Gasnier
American action adventure films
1910s action adventure films
1917 lost films
Lost action adventure films
1910s American films
Silent action adventure films